Zillennials (sometimes called Zennials) are the micro-generation of individuals born on the cusp of the Millennial and Generation Z demographic cohorts. Researchers and popular media cite birth years for this micro generation from the early 1990s to the early 2000s. The majority of this cohort graduated high school and reached adulthood at some point in the 2010s, and they are often the children of younger Baby boomers and Generation X.

Zillennials are described as being kids and toddlers at the time of the September 11th terrorist attacks, making them the first cohort to experience adolescence in a “post-9/11” world. Their outlook on life was further shaped by later crises such as the Great Recession of 2008 and the COVID-19 pandemic. Additionally, this cohort witnessed the digital transition of the 2000s and 2010s throughout their childhood and youth: from dial-up Internet to high speed mobile LTE Internet, from corded home phones to cell phones, from home computers to mobile devices with the capability to connect to the Internet, and from cellular flip phones to smartphones.

Terminology and birth year definitions
The term Zillennial is a portmanteau of "Generation Z" and "Millennial". A similar portmanteau, Zennial, can be seen used as well. Other names that have been proposed for these cuspers include the Snapchat Generation by Ubl, Walden, and Arbit, and MinionZ by Smit.

Although the birth years of the micro-generation are not specifically defined, Zillennials are born on the cusp of the Millennial generation and Generation Z, i.e. near the end of the Millennial generation and the beginning of Generation Z.

Authors Hannah Ubl, Lisa Walden, and Debra Arbit define the Millennial/Gen Z cuspers as those born from 1992 to 1998, as does Mary Everett, writing for PopSugar and Vogue. A WGSN case study on Zennials stated that micro-generations are "typically smaller groups born in bursts of time that extend only six years, versus the 15 years a generation" and defines Zennials as those born from 1992 to 1998.

Others have defined Zillennials as those born from 1993 to 1998, including Deon Smit, Maisy Farren, writing for Vice, Lindsay Dogson, writing for Business Insider Mexico, and MetLife.

Other sources have identified their own ranges for Zillennials. Avery Hartmans, writing for Business Insider USA, defines Zillennials as anyone born between 1990 and 2000. Ketchum Inc. defines GenZennials as those born from 1992 to 2000. Fullscreen, LLC defines the Millennial/Gen Z cusp group as those born from approximately 1993 to 1999 in their research. Mary Donahue defines the cuspers as those born from 1995 to 2000.

Characteristics and traits 
While generational boundaries are fluid, Zillennials are influenced by both Millennials and Generation Z. According to a WGSN case study, many Zillennials tend to feel more aligned with Millennial sentiments and assume they are Millennials by default. They are characterized as being "raised less by optimistic Boomers and more by skeptical Xers and pragmatic Gen Jonesers, who raised them to focus more on the practical rather than the aspirational."

According to a study done by Fullscreen, while Zillennials are comfortable with technology and social media, they acknowledge it is a "love-hate relationship" with both, each coming with their respective good and bad. However, a majority of them do believe that technology is making the world a better place. The study also found the cohort to be more creative and more likely to self-identify as a minority than other generational cohorts. They are more diverse than Millennials before them. Diversity and independence are the traits used most often by the cohort to describe what will set their micro-generation apart.

Patrice Peck, writing for Cosmopolitan, stated that Zillennials were between the ages of 18 and 29 during the 2020 United States elections, and were the "key to ousting then-president Donald Trump and sending Joe Biden and Kamala Harris to the White House."

In a 2022 interview for eMarketer, Abercrombie & Fitch's VP of Marketing & Brand Strategy, Megan Brophy, shared that their target demographic were 25 to 29 years old, calling them "Zillennial" since the group had "a bit of both Gen Z and millennial mentality". Between 2020 and 2022, A&F rebranded based upon what they learned from their target demographic in a new TikTok era with Zillennials telling them that they “wish to make the best of every single day.” They want their every day lives to be just as exciting as any weekend plans, not wanting to just live for the weekends nor just to work. Additionally, VP Brophy went on to say that Zillennials along with TikTok are creating the culture in 2022.

See also
List of generations
Cusper
Xennials

References

20th century
21st century
Cultural generations